Haloragis is a genus of flowering plants in the family Haloragaceae. Some species are known commonly as seaberry and most are native to the southern hemisphere. They are annual or perennial herbs to small shrubs, and many are terrestrial wetland plants.

Taxonomy 

List of selected species:
Haloragis bibracteolata 
Haloragis capensis 
Haloragis depressa
Haloragis erecta
Haloragis hexandra 
Haloragis masatierrana 
Haloragis palauensis 
Haloragis prostrata
Haloragis roei 
Haloragis yarrabensis

A number of species, previously placed here, have subsequently been placed in other related genera, including:
 Haloragis micrantha (Thunb.) R.Br. ex Sieb. & Zucc. (syn. Gonocarpus micranthus Thunb.)

Etymology 

The name is derived from two Greek words, halos (sea or salt) and rhagos (grape-berry). This refers to the first discovered species being found on beaches and having globular fruit.

Distribution and habitat 

Of the 28 species, 23 are endemic to Australia and the remainder to the South Pacific (Tuvalu, New Caledonia, New Zealand, the Cook Islands, Rapa Nui and the Juan Fernandez Islands, e.g. H. prostrata (Cook Islands).

Cultivation 

Some cultivars are valued as ornamentals, e.g. 'Wanganui Bronze', 'Wellington Bronze'.

References

Bibliography

External links
Jepson Manual Treatment
Species List

Haloragaceae
Saxifragales genera